Medical Microbiology and Immunology is a peer-reviewed medical journal covering all aspects of the interrelationship between infectious agents and their hosts, with microbial and viral pathogenesis and the immunological host response to infections in particular as major topics. It is published by Springer and was established in 1886 by Robert Koch and Carl Flügge, who were the first editors-in-chief for more than 20 years. Originally named “Zeitschrift für Hygiene”, it was renamed multiple times in the light of scientific and medical advances and the emergence of new research disciplines, before adopting its current name Medical Microbiology and Immunology in 1971. The current editors-in-chief are V.A.J. Kempf (Bacteriology), M.J. Reddehase (Virology) and C. Bogdan (Immunology).

Abstracting and indexing
According to the Journal Citation Reports, the journal has a 2016 impact factor of 3.093.

The journal is abstracted and indexed in:

Editors-in-chief 
The following persons have been editors-in-chief of the journal:
 Robert Koch (1886-1910)
 Carl Flügge (1886-1923)
 Georg Gaffky (1905-1912)
 Fred Neufeld (1918-1944)
 Robert Doerr (1924-1952)
 Martin Hahn (1924-1934)
 Hermann Dold (1934-1944)
 Richard Otto (1935-1944)
 Heinrich Zeiss (1935-1944)
 Heinrich Reichel (1938-1940)
 Friedrich Erhard Haag (1942-1944)
 Ernst Rodenwaldt (1942-1944)
 Hans Schlossberger (1947-1957)
 Walter Kikuth (1957-1965)
  (1966-2001)
 Sucharit Bhakdi (1990-2012)
  (1990-2018)
 Hans Wilhelm Doerr (2001-2017)
 Volkhard A.J. Kempf (2012–present)
 Matthias J. Reddehase (2018–present)
 Christian Bogdan (2018–present)

References

External links 
 

Springer Science+Business Media academic journals
Microbiology journals
Immunology journals
Publications established in 1886
English-language journals